Taanah, alternatively spelled Tana, is a village in northern Aleppo Governorate, northwestern Syria.

Administratively the village belongs to Nahiya Akhtarin in Azaz District. Nearby localities include Ablah  to the north and Fafin  to the southwest. In the 2004 census, Taanah had a population of 1,062.

References

Villages in Aleppo Governorate